This is a survey of the postage stamps and postal history of Nicaragua.

First stamps
Nicaragua gained independence from Spain in 1821. It has produced its own stamps since 1862.

Collectors of the stamps and covers of Nicaragua join the Nicaragua Study Group. Search the web to find the group.

References

Further reading
 Birks, Michael. The Revenues, Seals and Cinderellas of Nicaragua. Flixton, Urmston, Manchester: M.P. Birks, 1998 28p. 
 Maxwell, Clyde R. Bibliography of Nicaraguan Philately. Irvine, CA.: C.R. Maxwell, 1992 16p.
 Maxwell, Clyde R. Nicaragua to 1940: A Philatelic Handbook. Irvine, CA.: C.R. Maxwell, 1992 209p.
 Nicaragua Study Group. Nicarao. State College PA.: Nicaragua Study Group, 1990- (Quarterly journal).

Postal system of Nicaragua
Philately of Nicaragua